Piotr Pawlicki may refer to:

 Piotr Pawlicki Sr. (born 1963), Polish speedway rider, in 1992 Speedway World Team Cup
 Piotr Pawlicki Jr. (born 1994), Polish speedway rider, son of the above